The 1994 Florida State Seminoles football team represented Florida State University in the 1994 NCAA Division I-A football season. The team was coached by Bobby Bowden and played their home games at Doak Campbell Stadium. The team was selected national champion by Dunkel.

Schedule

Roster

Rankings

Season summary

at Miami (FL)

Florida

Florida (Sugar Bowl)

References

Florida State
Florida State Seminoles football seasons
Atlantic Coast Conference football champion seasons
Sugar Bowl champion seasons
Florida State Seminoles football